Mimozethes is a genus of moths belonging to the subfamily Cyclidiinae. It was first described by Warren in 1901.

Species
 Mimozethes angula Chu & Wang, 1987
 Mimozethes argentilinearia Leech, 1897
 Mimozethes lilacinaria Leech, 1897

References

Cyclidiinae
Drepanidae genera